Gerda Neumann (14 December 1915 – 26 January 1947) was a Danish film actress. She appeared in nine films between 1936 and 1947. She was born in Copenhagen and died in the 1947 KLM Douglas DC-3 Copenhagen airplane crash in Copenhagen, Denmark. She was the older sister of musician Ulrik Neumann.

Filmography
 Når katten er ude (1947)
 Mens sagføreren sover (1945)
 Musik i haven (1945)
 Otte hundrede akkorder (1945)
 Rejsefeber (1944)
 Op med humøret (1943)
 Frk. Vildkat (1942)
 En ganske almindelig pige (1940)
 Sun Over Denmark (1936)

References

External links

1915 births
1947 deaths
Danish film actresses
Victims of aviation accidents or incidents in Denmark
20th-century Danish actresses
Victims of aviation accidents or incidents in 1947